Connor Oliver Wood (born 17 July 1996) is an English professional footballer who plays for Colchester United, on loan from Leyton Orient as a left back and left winger.

Career

Early career
Wood was born in Harlow, playing youth football for Essex-based non-league club Buckhurst Hill.

He then played for Soham Town Rangers, Chesham United, Nike Academy and Leicester City.

Bradford City
Wood signed a three-year contract with Bradford City in June 2018. He stated he joined the club due to their youth policy.

He made his senior debut on 1 September 2018 and scored his first goal on 1 January 2019, in his first first-team game since November 2018. Later that month he spoke about the club's improved form. He began the 2019–20 season in a more attacking role, and in October 2019 he spoke about the change in the club's mentality, including his determination that the club would 'bounce back' following their first defeat after a run of three victories. In November 2019 he was praised by manager Gary Bowyer, and later that month Wood spoke about the club's recent lack of form.

In February 2020, after captain James Vaughan left the club on loan, Wood said he would still speak to Vaughan for advice.

By 18 February 2021 Wood had made 61 successive league starts for Bradford City, including playing every minute in the club's 2020–21 season to date. Later that month he praised the maturity and detail of City's interim managers Mark Trueman and Conor Sellars.

On 12 May 2021 he was one of nine players that Bradford City announced would leave the club on 30 June 2021 when their contracts expire.

Leyton Orient
On 16 June 2021 it was announced that Wood would sign for Leyton Orient after the expiry of his contract with Bradford City. In August 2021 Wood was dropped from the Leyton Orient first team, ending a run of 83 consecutive league games. He moved on loan to Colchester United in January 2023.

Playing style
Primarily a left back, in January 2019 he began to be used further up the field (as a left winger, a position he had some experience of from earlier in his career. He made his first appearance of the 2019–20 season on the left of the front three, and continued in a new attacking role for future games. In December 2019 he spoke out about being encouraged by manager Gary Bowyer to be more vocal on the pitch. In January 2020 he spoke about playing regularly.

Career statistics

References

1996 births
Living people
English footballers
Soham Town Rangers F.C. players
Chesham United F.C. players
Nike Academy players
Leicester City F.C. players
Bradford City A.F.C. players
Leyton Orient F.C. players
Colchester United F.C. players
Southern Football League players
English Football League players
Association football fullbacks
Association football wingers
Sportspeople from Harlow